This is a list of lighthouses in Myanmar.

Lighthouses

See also
 Lists of lighthouses and lightvessels

References

External links

 

Myanmar
Lighthouses
Lighthouses